Booroodabin Division is a former local government area of Queensland, Australia, located in inner northern Brisbane immediately north of the Brisbane CBD today. It existed from 1879 to 1903.

History
Booroodabin Division came into existence on 11 November 1879 with a population of 3462, as one of the original divisions created by the Divisional Boards Act 1879.

On 13 Jan 1903, the Booroodabin Division was abolished and absorbed into Town of Brisbane.

Chairmen
 1897-1900: Thomas Welsby

References

External links
 

Booroodabin Division
1879 establishments in Australia
1903 disestablishments in Australia